Signor Goldoni is a 2007 English-language opera by Luca Mosca to a libretto by Pierluigi Melega. Melega's English libretto concerns the playwright Carlo Goldoni and his characters, but also incorporates elements from Shakespeare's plays set in the Veneto; Othello, Romeo and Juliet, The Merchant of Venice and Two Gentlemen of Verona, with Shakespeare himself appearing.

Recording
Barbara Hannigan (Mozart's Despina), Alda Caiello (L'angelo Rafael), Cristina Zavalloni (Mirandolina), Sara Mingardo (Desdemona), Michael Bennett (Arlecchino), Chris Ziegler (Baffo), Roberto Abbondanza (Goldoni) & Michael Leibundgut (Othello) Orchestra and chorus of Teatro La Fenice, Andrea Molino, DVD Dynamic.

References

Operas
2007 operas
Carlo Goldoni